Omar Mascarell González (born 2 February 1993) is a Spanish professional footballer who plays for Elche CF as a defensive midfielder.

Club career

Real Madrid
Born in Santa Cruz de Tenerife, Canary Islands, Mascarell joined Real Madrid's youth system at the age of 17, arriving from local CD Laguna de Tenerife. On 21 August 2011 he made his debut as a senior, playing with Real Madrid Castilla against Sporting de Gijón B in the Segunda División B. He contributed 24 games during the season (11 starts) as the B's returned to the Segunda División after an absence of five years, scoring twice in the process.

Mascarell started the 2012–13 campaign with the C team also in the third division, but was promoted back to the reserves after only a couple of weeks. He played his first professional match on 28 October 2012, coming on as a substitute for Pedro Mosquera for the last 17 minutes of a 2–4 home loss to Sporting de Gijón.

Mascarell made his La Liga debut with the Merengues on 1 June 2013, replacing Mesut Özil late into a 4–2 home win against CA Osasuna in what was the last matchday. On 6 August of the following year, he joined English Championship club Derby County on a season-long loan. He made his debut for the latter five days later, substituting Will Hughes in the 53rd minute of a 1–0 victory over Rotherham United at Pride Park Stadium.

On 3 August 2015, Mascarell moved to Sporting de Gijón on loan for the season. He played 28 matches in all competitions, starting 20 in the league and helping the Asturians finally retain their top-flight status.

Eintracht Frankfurt
On 6 July 2016, Mascarell signed with Eintracht Frankfurt on a three-year contract. His maiden appearance in the Bundesliga took place on 27 August, when he played the full 90 minutes in a 1–0 home defeat of FC Schalke 04.

Mascarell spent the better part of the 2017–18 season on the sidelines, due to an achilles tendon injury. He did play the entire final of the DFB-Pokal on 19 May 2018, helping to a 3–1 win over league champions FC Bayern Munich.

Schalke 04
On 29 June 2018, Mascarell's buy back clause was activated by Real Madrid for €4 million. He was subsequently sold to Schalke 04 also in the German top division for €10 million, signing a four-year contract. 

For 2019–20, Mascarell was appointed vice-captain. After Alexander Nübel decided to leave the club at the end of the season, he was selected by head coach David Wagner as his successor; however, he was stripped off on 30 January 2021 and replaced by Sead Kolašinac.

Elche
On 23 August 2021, free agent Mascarell returned to his home country after agreeing to a one-year deal with Elche CF in the top tier.

International career
Mascarell is of Equatoguinean descent through his great-grandmother. In May 2012, he was called by that national team for the 2014 FIFA World Cup qualifiers against Tunisia and Sierra Leone. He travelled to Malabo, but nonetheless declined to play in any of the two matches because he had already appeared for Spain at youth level and did not want to give up on that option; according to the local press, the Equatoguinean Football Federation was completing the administrative procedures of his eligibility.

Career statistics

Honours
Eintracht Frankfurt
DFB-Pokal: 2017–18

References

External links

1993 births
Living people
Spanish sportspeople of Equatoguinean descent
Spanish footballers
Footballers from Santa Cruz de Tenerife
Association football midfielders
La Liga players
Segunda División players
Segunda División B players
Real Madrid C footballers
Real Madrid Castilla footballers
Real Madrid CF players
Sporting de Gijón players
Elche CF players
English Football League players
Derby County F.C. players
Bundesliga players
Eintracht Frankfurt players
FC Schalke 04 players
FC Schalke 04 II players
Spain youth international footballers
Spanish expatriate footballers
Expatriate footballers in England
Expatriate footballers in Germany
Spanish expatriate sportspeople in England
Spanish expatriate sportspeople in Germany